Mad Fashion is an American reality television series which premiered October 4, 2011, on Bravo. Mad Fashion follows former Project Runway contestant and celebrity designer Chris March as he creates unique outfits for his A-list clientele.

Episodes

References

External links

2010s American reality television series
2011 American television series debuts
2011 American television series endings
English-language television shows
Bravo (American TV network) original programming